Ann Pernille Vermund Tvede (born 3 December 1975) is a Danish architect (MAA) and politician known for co-founding and being the leader of the national-conservative political party Nye Borgerlige from 2015 until 2023. She was previously affiliated with the Conservative People's Party. She is currently a member of the Folketing, having been elected in the 2019 and 2022 Danish general elections.

Background 
Vermund is a graduate of the Royal Danish Academy of Fine Arts and worked as an architect before entering politics. She was the owner of the company Vermund Gere Arkitekter MAA. Vermund is divorced from her first husband and is the mother of three boys. In 2019, she married Danish author and businessman Lars Tvede.

Political career 
Vermund was a member of the Conservative People's Party and sat on the municipal council in Helsingør Municipality for the party from 2009 to 2011. In October 2015, she co-founded the Nye Borgerlige (New Right) party with Peter Seier Christensen. Vermund stated that she founded the party as she felt her old party had become too soft on the issues of immigration and the European Union. Politically, she defines herself as a conservative. Vermund was elected to the Folketing in 2019. In January 2023, Vermund announced she would not be standing for re-election at the next Danish general election and would therefore be resigning as leader of Nye Borgerlige in the coming year. On 7 February 2023 Lars Boje Mathiesen took over as new party leader.

References

External links 
 Biography on the website of the Danish Parliament (Folketinget)

1975 births
Living people
Politicians from Copenhagen
Conservative People's Party (Denmark) politicians
The New Right (Denmark) politicians
Women members of the Folketing
21st-century Danish women politicians
Critics of multiculturalism
Danish municipal councillors
Danish women architects
20th-century Danish architects
21st-century Danish architects
Royal Danish Academy of Fine Arts alumni
Members of the Folketing 2019–2022
Leaders of political parties in Denmark
Members of the Folketing 2022–2026